The ROH Pure Championship is a professional wrestling championship contested for in the American professional wrestling promotion Ring of Honor (ROH). The championship is generally contested in professional wrestling matches, in which participants execute scripted finishes rather than contend in direct competition. The current champion is Wheeler Yuta, who is in his record-setting second reign.

Pure wrestling rules 
Matches for the ROH Pure Championship are conducted under "Pure Wrestling Rules." As of 2023, the rules are as follows:

 Each wrestler has three rope breaks to stop submission holds and pinfalls. 
 After a wrestler exhausts his rope breaks, submission and pin attempts on or under the ropes by his opponent are considered legal.
 No closed-fist punches to the face permitted.
 Open-handed slaps or chops to the face are permitted. 
 Punches to the rest of the body are allowed, excluding low blows. 
 The first use of a closed fist to the face receives a warning. 
 The second use of a closed fist to the face results in disqualification.
 The title can change hands via disqualification and countout.
 Outside interference will result in automatic termination from the roster for the wrestler that interferes.
 If a title match reaches its time limit without a winner being declared, the winner is decided by a panel of three judges.

History 
The title was originally named the ROH Pure Wrestling Championship and A.J. Styles defeated CM Punk in the final of an eight-man, one night tournament to crown the first champion. The tournament took place at the Second Anniversary Show and also featured John Walters, Chris Sabin, Doug Williams, Matt Stryker, Josh Daniels and Jimmy Rave.

Styles was forced to vacate the Pure Wrestling title in the wake of the Rob Feinstein controversy that resulted in Total Nonstop Action Wrestling (TNA) abruptly ending its talent-sharing agreement with ROH (pulling all of its contracted performers, including Styles, from all ROH shows). However, for almost ten years ROH considered the Pure Wrestling Championship and the Pure Championship two distinct titles—not a single title that was merely renamed/re-branded. There was no mention of Styles on ROH's website as having held the Pure Championship, and it was seldom, if ever, acknowledged in commentary that Styles held the previous version of the title or that it even existed until in January 2014, when ROH released a DVD about Styles, describing him as the first ROH Pure Champion. Doug Williams would win the vacant title after he defeated Alex Shelley in the final of a one night mini-tournament at Reborn: Completion on July 17, 2004.

Retirement
On April 29, 2006, Weekend of Champions: Night Two saw the first ever title vs. title match in Ring of Honor as ROH World Champion Bryan Danielson took on ROH Pure Champion Nigel McGuinness. The match was contested under Pure title rules, but both the World and Pure titles were on the line. McGuinness won the bout by countout, but since only the Pure title could change hands on a countout, he did not win the ROH World Championship. The two faced each other again on August 12, 2006 in Liverpool, England, with Danielson defeating McGuinness to unify the ROH Pure Championship with the ROH World Championship. Danielson and McGuinness competed in a rematch for the ROH World Championship later that month, wrestling to a one-hour draw. After the match, Danielson announced that the ROH Pure Championship had been officially retired, and gave the title belt back to McGuinness to keep.

Revival

On January 30, 2020, nearly 14 years after it was retired, Ring of Honor announced they were reinstating the ROH Pure Championship, with a tournament to crown a new champion beginning in 2020. Following ROH taking a five-month hiatus due to the COVID-19 pandemic, a 16-man tournament was conducted in August 2020 to crown the new champion, which ultimately became Jonathan Gresham.

Reigns

Overall, there have been 12 championship reigns between 11 different champions. The title has been vacated once. A.J. Styles was the inaugural champion, while Jonathan Gresham was the first champion upon the title's revival. Wheeler Yuta has the most reigns with two. Nigel McGuinness had the longest reign at 350 days with 17 title defenses. Bryan Danielson had the shortest reign at less than a day since the title was decommissioned after being unified with the ROH World Championship.

Wheeler Yuta is the current champion in his record-setting second reign. He defeated Daniel Garcia at Final Battle on December 10, 2022 in Arlington, Texas

Names

Combined reigns

References

External links 
 ROH Pure Title History at Cagematch.net

World professional wrestling championships
Ring of Honor championships